The FEG AP9 is a semi-automatic pistol designed and manufactured by the FÉG company of Hungary.

History
Originally called the Model 48, FEG designed this handgun, based on the German Walther PP/PPK pistol series, just like many of the other post-World War II Hungarian pistols. The pistols were produced primarily for the civilian market, and export. Most commonly chambered in 9mm Browning Short (.380 ACP) ammunition with a 7-round magazine capacity or .32 ACP with an 8-round magazine, they are factory sighted for 25 metres.

A smaller version known as the APK9 was made for export to Egypt, but very few of these pistols were made.

Design
The AP9 is a self-loading pistol using the blowback mechanism with a double-action trigger, has a rotating safety/decocking lever on the left side of the slide, and is equipped with a firing pin safety mechanism, which prevents the firing pin from striking the primer of a loaded cartridge, unless the trigger is pulled. Field-stripping the pistol for cleaning is accomplished identically to the Walther PP pistol.

The frame is made of aluminum alloy and the slide is made from steel.

External links 
 Official website of the manufacturer

References

Semi-automatic pistols of Hungary
Fegyver- és Gépgyár firearms
.380 ACP semi-automatic pistols